Delaine Buses is a bus operator based in Bourne, Lincolnshire, England.

History
In 1890 William Smith began a horse drawn passenger service. After a taxi operation commenced in 1910, a 14-seat Ford Model T bus was purchased in 1919 and services commenced to Grantham, Spalding and Stamford. In May 1941 the business was incorporated.

Services
As of July 2020, Delaine Buses operates seven bus routes.

Fleet
From the 1930s to the 1990s, the majority of vehicles in the Delaine fleet were of Bedford or Leyland manufacture. Since 1995 Delaine has standardised on Volvos with East Lancs body, followed by switching over to Wrights in 2009 after East Lancs merged with Optare.

As of September 2014 the fleet consisted of 26 buses. A heritage fleet is also maintained.

Gallery

See also
List of bus operators of the United Kingdom

Further reading

References

External links

Company website

Bus operators in Lincolnshire
Companies based in Lincolnshire
Transport in Lincolnshire